{{DISPLAYTITLE:Xi1 Capricorni}}

Xi1 Capricorni, Latinized from ξ1 Capricorni, is an orange-hued star in the constellation Capricornus. With an apparent visual magnitude of +6.34, it is near the lower limit of brightness for stars that can be seen with the naked eye.
  
It is an evolved K-type giant star with a stellar classification of K0 III. With an age of 3.35 billion years, this star has an estimated 1.55 times the mass of the Sun and is radiating 139 times the Sun's luminosity from its enlarged photosphere at an effective temperature of about 4,439 K.

References

K-type giants
Capricorni, Xi1
Capricornus (constellation)
Durchmusterung objects
Capricorni, 01
191753
099529
7712